In mathematics – and in particular the study of games on the unit square – Parthasarathy's theorem is a generalization of Von Neumann's minimax theorem.  It states that a particular class of games has a mixed value, provided that at least one of the players has a strategy that is restricted to absolutely continuous distributions with respect to the Lebesgue measure (in other words, one of the players is forbidden to use a pure strategy).

The theorem is attributed to the Indian mathematician Thiruvenkatachari Parthasarathy.

Theorem

For , define

Then

This is equivalent to the statement that the game induced by  has a value.  Note that one player (WLOG ) is forbidden from using a pure strategy.

Parthasarathy goes on to exhibit a game in which

which thus has no value.  There is no contradiction because in this case neither player is restricted to absolutely continuous distributions (and the demonstration that the game has no value requires both players to use pure strategies).

References
T. Parthasarathy 1970.  On Games over the unit square, SIAM, volume 19, number 2.

Game theory
Theorems in discrete mathematics
Theorems in measure theory